The Battle of Modon took place in August 1500 during the war of 1499–1503 between the Ottoman Empire and the Republic of Venice. The Ottomans, who had won the Battle of Zonchio (First Battle of Lepanto / Battle of Sapienza) the previous year, were again victorious under Admiral Kemal Reis.

In December 1499, the Venetians attacked Lepanto with the hope of regaining the territories which they lost with the Battle of Zonchio. Kemal Reis set sail from Cefalonia and retook Lepanto from the Venetians. He stayed in Lepanto between April and May 1500, where his ships were repaired by an army of 15,000 Ottoman craftsmen who were brought from the area. From there Kemal Reis set sail and bombarded the Venetian ports on the island of Corfu, and in August 1500 he once again defeated the Venetian fleet. He bombarded the fortress of Modon from the sea and captured the town. He later engaged with the Venetian fleet off the coast of Coron and captured the town along with a Venetian brigantine. From there he sailed towards the Island of Sapientza (Sapienza) and sank the Venetian galley "Lezza". In September 1500, Kemal Reis assaulted Voiussa and in October he appeared at Cape Santa Maria on the Island of Lefkada before ending the campaign and returning to Constantinople in November.

With the Battle of Modon, the Ottoman fleet and army quickly overwhelmed most of the Venetian possessions in Greece.

Modon and Coron, the "two eyes of the Republic", were lost. Ottoman cavalry raids reached Venetian territory in northern Italy, and, in 1503, Venice again had to seek peace, recognizing the Ottoman gains.

See also

 Ottoman Navy

References
John E. Dotson: Foundations of Venetian Naval Strategy from Pietro II Orseoto to the Battle of Zoncho, 1000-1500 (2001)
Salvatore Bono: "Corsari nel Mediterraneo" (Corsairs in the Mediterranean), Oscar Storia Mondadori (Perugia, 1993)

Modon
1500 in Europe
Modon
Ottoman Peloponnese
History of Messenia
1500 in the Ottoman Empire